The 1976 Oakland Athletics season involved the A's finishing second in the American League West with a record of 87 wins and 74 losses,  games behind the Kansas City Royals. The A's failed to win the division (and make the playoffs) for the first time since 1970. The team set and still holds the American League record for most stolen bases with 341, second in Major League Baseball's modern era (since 1901) to the 1911 New York Giants, who had 347.

The Athletics did not eclipse this season's win total until 1988 (104 wins). Nearly all of the team's stars (Sal Bando, Rollie Fingers, Gene Tenace, Joe Rudi, Bert Campaneris, Don Baylor, Phil Garner, Billy Williams, Claudell Washington, and an injury-plagued Willie McCovey) departed after this season. This staggering mass exodus led to a 24-win plunge in 1977 to last place in the standings and attendance.

Offseason 
 October 10, 1975: Dal Maxvill was released.
 December 9, 1975: Ray Fosse was purchased by the Cleveland Indians.
 April 2, 1976: Reggie Jackson, Ken Holtzman, and Bill Van Bommell (minors) were traded to the Baltimore Orioles for Don Baylor, Mike Torrez, and  Owner Charlie Finley stated that he made the trade to obtain more pitching for the  He later admitted that he had refused to agree to Jackson's salary 
 April 5, 1976: Ken McMullen was signed as a free agent.

Regular season 
As the  season got underway (on April 9 for Oakland), the basic rules of player contracts were changing. It was ruled that baseball's reserve clause only bound players for one season after their contract expired. All players not signed to multi-year contracts would be eligible for free agency at the end of the 1976 season. Finley reacted by trading star players and attempting to sell others. On June 15, Finley sold left fielder Joe Rudi and relief pitcher Rollie Fingers to the Boston Red Sox for $1 million each, and pitcher Vida Blue to the New York Yankees for $1.5 million. Three days later, Bowie Kuhn voided the transactions in the "best interests of baseball." Amid the turmoil, the A's still finished second in the A.L. West, 2.5 games behind the Royals.

Fire sale
Before the June 15 trading deadline, Finley contacted the New York Yankees and the Boston Red Sox. He had proposed a trade to the Red Sox that would have involved Joe Rudi, Rollie Fingers, Vida Blue, Gene Tenace, and Sal Bando for outfielder Fred Lynn, catcher Carlton Fisk, and prospects. In trade talks with the Yankees, Finley proposed Vida Blue for catcher Thurman Munson, along with either outfielder Roy White or Elliott Maddox; he also offered Rudi for Munson.
On June 14, Finley was unable to make any trades, and had started contacting other teams about the possibility of selling his players' contracts. Rudi, Blue, Baylor, and Tenace were worth $1 million each, while Bando could be acquired for $500,000. Boston general manager Dick O'Connell was in Oakland as the Red Sox would play the Athletics on June 15. Field manager Darrell Johnson had declared that he was interested in Rudi and Fingers; the Red Sox had agreed to purchase both contracts for one million dollars each.

O'Connell had contacted Detroit Tigers general manager Jim Campbell to purchase Vida Blue for one million dollars so that the New York Yankees could not get him. Gabe Paul of the Yankees advised that he would pay $1.5 million for the opportunity to acquire Blue. Finley offered Blue a three-year extension worth $485,000 per season to make the sale more attractive to the Yankees. With the extension, the Yankees agreed to purchase Blue.

Finley had then proceeded to contact Bill Veeck of the Chicago White Sox about purchasing Sal Bando. He then contacted the Texas Rangers, as they were interested in acquiring Don Baylor for the one million dollar asking price.

Season standings 

Record vs. opponents

Notable transactions 
 April 19: Tim Hosley was selected off waivers from the Chicago Cubs.
 June 8: 1976 Major League Baseball Draft
Rickey Henderson was drafted in the fourth round, and signed on July 9, 1976.
Ernie Camacho was drafted in the first round (18th pick) of the Secondary Phase.
 June 9: Nate Colbert was signed as a free agent.
 August 30: Willie McCovey was purchased from the San Diego Padres.

Roster

Player stats

Batting

Starters by position 
Note: Pos = Position; G = Games played; AB = At bats; H = Hits; Avg. = Batting average; HR = Home runs; RBI = Runs batted in

Other batters 
Note: G = Games played; AB = At bats; H = Hits; Avg. = Batting average; HR = Home runs; RBI = Runs batted in

Pitching

Starting pitchers 
Note: G = Games pitched; IP = Innings pitched; W = Wins; L = Losses; ERA = Earned run average; SO = Strikeouts

Other pitchers 
Note: G = Games pitched; IP = Innings pitched; W = Wins; L = Losses; ERA = Earned run average; SO = Strikeouts

Relief pitchers 
Note: G = Games pitched; W = Wins; L = Losses; SV = Saves; ERA = Earned run average; SO = Strikeouts

Farm system

References

External links
1976 Oakland Athletics team page at Baseball Reference
1976 Oakland Athletics team page at www.baseball-almanac.com

Oakland Athletics seasons
Oakland Athletics season
Oakland